The atoll starling (Aplonis feadensis) is a species of starling in the family Sturnidae. It is found in northern Melanesia: Green Islands, Nuguria, Ninigo,  Hermit Islands and Ontong Java Atoll. Its natural habitat is subtropical or tropical moist lowland forests. The species apparently nests in holes in trees. It is threatened by habitat loss.

References

atoll starling
Birds of Papua New Guinea
Birds of the Bismarck Archipelago
Birds of the Solomon Islands
atoll starling
Taxonomy articles created by Polbot